Wilfrid Philip Ward (2 January 1856 – 1916) was an English essayist and biographer. Ward and his friend Baron Friedrich von Hügel have been described as "the two leading lay English Catholic thinkers of their generation".

Life
Wilfrid Ward was born in 1856 at Old Hall, Ware, Hertfordshire, one of nine children of Catholic converts William George Ward and his wife Frances Wingfield Ward.

He first went to Downside College, then St. Edmund's College in Ware, Hertfordshire. He obtained a B.A. degree from London University and later attended Catholic University College, Kensington. In 1877, Ward went to the English College, Rome to prepare for the priesthood and returned a year later to continue his studies at Ushaw College, in Durham, England. In 1881, shortly before his planned ordination, Ward reconsidered, and joined the Inner Temple to take up a career in law. Subsequently discouraged, he then became a writer. Ward’s particular interests were apologetics and theology.

In 1885 Ward became a lecturer on philosophy at Ushaw. In 1887 he married Josephine Mary Hope-Scott; the couple lived on the Isle of Wight. Josephine Ward became a novelist. They had five children. The eldest, Mary Josephine "Maisie"  married Frank Sheed and together founded the publishing house Sheed and Ward.

Biographer

In 1889, Ward published a biography of his father, William George Ward and the Oxford Movement. This proving successful, he then wrote William George Ward and the Catholic Revival,. Cardinal Herbert Vaughan then invited Ward to write a biography of the late Cardinal Nicholas Wiseman. This was followed in 1912 by a two volume biography of John Henry Newman.

In 1890 Ward was appointed examiner in Mental and Moral Philosophy to the Royal University of Ireland. He lectured at Lowell Institute, Boston in 1914.

Editor
From 1906 to 1915, Ward edited the Dublin Review. During his tenure, the journal published articles by G. K. Chesterton, Hilaire Belloc, Francis Thompson and other well-known writers. Ward believed very strongly that Catholics should be involved in the affairs of the nation.

He also contributed to publications such as the Edinburgh Review, Quarterly Review, Contemporary Review. Wilfrid Ward died in 1916.

Works
 William George Ward and the Oxford Movement, Macmillan & Co., 1893 [1st Pub. 1889].
 William George Ward and the Catholic Revival, Macmillan & Co., 1893 [second edition 1912.
 Witnesses to the Unseen, and Other Essays Macmillan & Co., 1893.
 The Life and Times of Nicholas Wiseman, Longmans, Green & Co., 1897.
 Problems and Persons, Longmans, Green, and Co., 1903
 Aubrey de Vere: A Memoir, Longmans, Green & Co., 1904.
 Ten Personal Studies, Longmans, Green, and Co., 1908.
 Life of John Henry, Cardinal Newman, Based on his Private Journals and Correspondence,  Longmans, Green, and Co., 1912.
 The Oxford Movement, T.C. & E.C. Jack, 1912.
 Men and Matters, Longmans, Green & Co., 1914.
 Last Lectures of Wilfrid Ward, Longmans, Green & Co., 1918

References

 This article incorporates text from a publication now in the public domain: Gilman, D. C.; Thurston, H. T.; Moore, F., eds. (1905). "Ward, Wilfrid Philip". New International Encyclopedia (1st ed.). New York: Dodd, Mead.

Further reading

 Maisie Ward (1934), The Wilfrid Wards and the Transition, London: Sheed & Ward.
 Maisie Ward (1937), Insurrection versus Resurrection, London: Sheed & Ward.
 Wilfrid Sheed (1985), Frank and Maisie: A Memoir with Parents, New York: Simon & Schuster.

1856 births
1916 deaths
English biographers
19th-century English educators
English essayists
English Roman Catholics
English Roman Catholic writers
People from Ware, Hertfordshire
20th-century English educators